Nairn Falls Provincial Park (Ucwalmícwts: Skweskwistqw7am) is a provincial park in British Columbia, Canada located on the Green River adjacent to British Columbia Highway 99 and the Canadian National Railway line just south of Pemberton and less than twenty minutes north of the resort town of Whistler. The 170 hectare park was established in 1966, shortly after the highway's opening, to protect and enhance visitor access to Nairn Falls.

Nairn Falls
Nairn Falls is a tiered waterfall connected by a small canyon which throttles the flow of the Green River just before its accession to the lowlands of the Pemberton Valley and its confluence with the Lillooet River just above that river's estuary into Lillooet Lake.

Facilities
The park's campground, located in forest land near the falls, has 94 vehicle-accessible sites and is open from May to October.

References

External links
BC Parks Info Site on Nairn Falls
Youtube: Nairn Falls by obhol #1
Youtube: Nairn Falls by obhol #2
Youtube: Narin Falls by wonderSpud #1
Youtube: Narin Falls by wonderSpud #2
Hike to the Nairn Falls Waterfall

Provincial parks of British Columbia
Waterfalls of British Columbia
Pemberton Valley
1966 establishments in British Columbia
Protected areas established in 1966